Freedom from religion may refer to:
 Separation of church and state
 Aspect of, or contrast to, various conceptions of freedom of religion
 Freedom From Religion Foundation
 Irreligion